Fazlollah Sadr was an Iranian pan-Iranist politician who served as a member of the parliament from 1967 to 1975.

A senior member of the Pan-Iranist Party, he was expelled from the party after he voted in favor of Bahraini Independence in the parliament and in early 1971 he founded Iranians' Party and became its leader.

References 

Pan-Iranist Party politicians
Rastakhiz Party politicians
Deputies of Qom
Iranian nationalists
Secretaries-General of political parties in Iran
Members of the 22nd Iranian Majlis
Members of the 23rd Iranian Majlis
Possibly living people
Year of birth missing